Koffi Senaya (12 October 1956, Lomé – 5 August 2019, Paris), known professionally as Jimi Hope, was a Togolese musician, painter and sculptor. He first became known through the Acide Rock group.

Albums 
 Born To Love
 It's too late
 I can't take it
 Tôt ou tard

References 

1956 births
2019 deaths
Togolese male singers
20th-century male singers
21st-century Togolese people
People from Lomé